Darevskia raddei, known commonly as the Armenian lizard, is a species of lizard in the family Lacertidae. The species is endemic to Eurasia. There are three subspecies.

Etymology
The specific name, raddei, is in honor of German naturalist Gustav Radde.

Geographic range
D. raddei is found in Armenia, Azerbaijan, Georgia, Iran, and Turkey.

Habitat

Subspecies
Three subspecies are recognized as being valid, including the nominotypical subspecies.
Darevskia raddei chaldoranensis 
Darevskia raddei raddei 
Darevskia raddei vanensis 

Nota bene: A trinomial authority in parentheses indicates that the subspecies was originally described in a genus other than Darevskia.

References

Further reading
Boettger O (1892). "Kriechthiere der Kaukasusländer, gessamelt durch die Radde-Valentin'ische Expedition nach dem Karabagh und durch die Herren Dr. J. Valentin und P. Reibisch ". Bericht über die Senckenbergische Naturforschende Gesellschaft in Frankfurt am Main 1892: 131-150. (Lacerta muralis var. raddei, new variety, pp. 142-144). (in German and Latin).
Grechko VV, Bannikova AA, Kosuchkin SA, Ryabinina NL, Milto KD, Darevsky IS, Kramerov DA (2007). "Molecular Genetic Diversification of the Lizard Complex Darevskia raddei (Sauria: Lacertidae): Early Stages of Speciation". Molecular Biology 41 (5): 764-775.

Darevskia
Reptiles described in 1892
Taxa named by Oskar Boettger